Sedum debile, commonly called orpine stonecrop or weakstem stonecrop, is a low growing  carpet forming flowering plant species of the genus Sedum in the family Crassulaceae.

Description and distribution
The species' pedicels are long while the stems are slender and weak with round and flat leaves and yellow colored flowers.

The flowers of Sedum debile have sepals which are pale green and glaucous in color. The apex, while obtuse is also emarginated.

References

debile
Taxa named by Sereno Watson